Christopher William Mills (born 29 March 1983) is a former speedway rider from England.

Speedway career
He rode in the top tier of British Speedway for various clubs, the last being the Wolverhampton Wolves during the 2012 Elite League speedway season. He rode for 19 different clubs during his career and started his racing career at Arena Essex Hammers in 2001.

References 

1983 births
Living people
British speedway riders
Birmingham Brummies riders
Oxford Cheetahs riders